The Academy of Medical Sciences is an organisation established in the UK in 1998. It is one of the four UK National Academies, the others being the British Academy, the Royal Academy of Engineering and the Royal Society.

Its mission is to advance biomedical and health research and its translation into benefits for society. The academy consists of a group of around 1200 Fellows elected from fields across the biomedical sciences. The academy seeks ultimately to advance medical science and improve health by investing in talented researchers, engaging people on health-related issues and providing expert impartial advice.  its president is Dame Anne Johnson.

History 

The academy was established in 1998 following the recommendations of a working group chaired by Michael Atiyah, former president of the Royal Society. A single national organisation was formed to support biomedical scientists and clinical academics working together to promote advances in medical science. It is one of the four learned academies in the United Kingdom, with the Royal Society, Royal Academy of Engineering and British Academy. The intention of the founders was to create a national resource outside the framework of Government, with the expertise and authority to deal with scientific and societal aspects of public policy issues in healthcare.

The formation of the academy occurred against a backdrop of increasing fragmentation and specialisation within the medical profession. The academy merged with the Novartis Foundation in 2008, and moved to a dedicated headquarters building at 41 Portland Place in October 2010. This building provides office space for its 39 members of staff, and has rooms for events and conferences.

Activities

Policy 
Areas of policy work originate from within the Academy Council and wider Fellowship, and in response to consultations from the government, Parliament and other relevant bodies.  work included reports on improving public health by 2040, using animals in research, diabetes and obesity, the use of data in medical research and the use of non-human primates in research.

Careers 
The academy's National Mentoring and Outreach Scheme was established in 2002 and is supported by the UK Department of Health, the National Institute for Health and Care Research (NIHR) and NHS Education for Scotland. The programme provides one-to-one mentoring by Academy Fellows for Clinical Lecturers and Clinician Scientist Fellows. It also offers activities for Academic Clinical Fellows, Clinical Training Fellows and MB PhD students.

Grants 
The academy's funding schemes focus on areas of specific and specialist need, addressing perceived shortages within key speciality areas, and international collaboration. Schemes include Clinician Scientist Fellowships, Starter Grants for Clinical Lecturers and UK/Middle East Exchange Fellowships.

Public engagement and dialogue 
The academy's public events demonstrate recent research and provide a platform for discussion of the latest science.

Linking academia and industry 
The academy's FORUM brings together biomedical scientists from academia and industry. As well as hosting its own conferences and events  the academy has made its headquarters at 41 Portland Place available on a private hire basis for industry and commercial events and conferences.

Fellowship 

, the academy has around 1200 Fellows  drawn from fundamental biological sciences, clinical academic medicine, public and population health, health technology implementation, veterinary science, dentistry, medical and nursing care and other professions allied to medical science as well as the basic fundamental mathematics, chemistry, physics, engineering, ethics, social science and the law. The Fellowship represents a national resource in medical science, offering their time and expertise to support the academy's work.

Up to 48 new Fellows are elected to the academy each year. Eight Sectional Committees spanning the range of medical sciences scrutinise candidates and make recommendations to Council for election. Becoming a Fellow indicates that the academy judges individuals to have made "outstanding contributions...to the progress of medical science and the development of better healthcare".  Election is often described as "prestigious".

Honorary Fellows include:
 Chen Zhu Minister of Health, Ministry of Health, China;
 Sydney Brenner, Distinguished Professor, Salk Institute;
 François Gros, Permanent Secretary of ‘Académie des Sciences’, Institut de France;
 William Castell LVO FCA, President & CEO, GE Healthcare;
 Professor Françoise Barré-Sinoussi Director, Unité de Régulation des Infections Rétrovirales, Institut Pasteur and Nobel Laureate;
 Sir Andrew Witty Chief Executive Officer, GSK.

Some of its members are retired and are no longer active in research.

List of presidents  

 1998–2002    Peter Lachmann (University of Cambridge)
 2002–2006    Keith Peters (University of Cambridge)
 2006–2011    John Irving Bell (University of Oxford)
 2011–2015    John Tooke (University College, London)
 2015–2020    Sir Robert Lechler (King's College London)
 2020 onward Dame Anne Johnson (University College, London)

Honours

The Academy of Medical Sciences presents numerous awards and lectures and medals to recognise significant achievements within the field of medical science.

See also
Fellow of the Academy of Medical Sciences
:Category:Fellows of the Academy of Medical Sciences (United Kingdom)
Royal Society

References

External links
 

 

Medical research institutes in the United Kingdom
Scientific organizations established in 1998
1998 establishments in the United Kingdom
Academic organisations based in the United Kingdom
Medical associations based in the United Kingdom